Rud Ab-e Gharbi Rural District is a rural district (dehestan) in Rud Ab District, Narmashir County, Kerman Province, Iran. At the 2006 census, its population was 14,554, in 3,450 families. The rural district has 40 villages.

References 

Rural Districts of Kerman Province
Narmashir County